Alma High School (AHS) is a public high school in Alma, Michigan, United States. It is part of the Alma Public Schools district.

References

External links 
 

Schools in Gratiot County, Michigan
Public high schools in Michigan